Alamabad-e Mohandes (also Romanized as ‘Alamābād-e Mohandes; also known as ‘Alamābād and Mohandes) is a village in Darkhoveyn Rural District, in the Central District of Shadegan County, Khuzestan Province, Iran. At the 2006 census, its population was 94, in 17 families.

References 

Populated places in Shadegan County